First Presbyterian Church of Tuscarora is a historic Presbyterian church located at Tuscarora in Livingston County, New York. It was built about 1844 and is a three- by five-bay Greek Revival style frame building. The gable roof is surmounted by a short, two stage tower topped by a pyramidal roof with a slight concave curve with a cross at its apex.  The interior features an elaborate Eastlake style three tier oil chandelier suspended in the center of the sanctuary over the main aisle. It is last surviving public building from the hamlet's brief early to mid-19th century commercial prosperity related to its location on the Genesee Valley Canal.

It was listed on the National Register of Historic Places in 2004.

References

Churches on the National Register of Historic Places in New York (state)
Presbyterian churches in New York (state)
Churches in Livingston County, New York
National Register of Historic Places in Livingston County, New York